Ornella is an Italian feminine given name, probably derived from , "flowering ash tree" (Fraxinus ornus). It was coined by Gabriele D'Annunzio in his 1904 play The Daughter of Iorio and made popular also thanks to the fame of singer Ornella Vanoni and, later, of actress Ornella Muti. It is most widespread in central and northern Italy, as well as in Abruzzo, while it is rarer in the South of the country.

Closely related but very rare names include Ornelia, and the masculine versions Ornello and Ornelio.

People
Ornella Barra (born 1953), Italian-born Monegasque businesswoman
Ornella Bertorotta (born 1967), Italian politician
Ornella Ferrara (born 1968), Italian long-distance runner 
Ornella Livingston (born 1991), Jamaican sprinter
Ornella Matta (born 1983), Puerto Rican born creator and activist
Ornella Muti (born 1955 as Francesca Romana Rivelli), Italian actress
Ornella Oettl Reyes (born 1991), Peruvian-German Alpine skier
Ornella Ongaro (born 1990), French motorcycle racer
Ornella Palla (born 1990), Uruguayan handball player
Ornella Vanoni (born 1934), Italian pop singer

References

Italian feminine given names